Solariella chodon is a species of sea snail, a marine gastropod mollusk in the family Solariellidae.

Description
The size of the shell attains 3.3 mm.

Distribution
This marine species occurs off Indonesia.

References

External links
 Vilvens C. (2009). New species and new records of Solariellidae (Gastropoda: Trochoidea) from Indonesia and Taiwan. Novapex 10(3): 69-96
 Williams S.T., Smith L.M., Herbert D.G., Marshall B.A., Warén A., Kiel S., Dyal P., Linse K., Vilvens C. & Kano Y. (2013) Cenozoic climate change and diversification on the continental shelf and slope: evolution of gastropod diversity in the family Solariellidae (Trochoidea). Ecology and Evolution 3(4): 887–917

chodon
Gastropods described in 2009